Black Gold (also known as Oil Imperium) is a business simulation game released in 1989 by reLINE Software.

Gameplay
The goal of the game is to promote and sell oil and defeat competitors using a number of fair and unfair strategies. A game move always takes a month, and each action in the game costs one or more days.

The game is designed for four players, either human (using a hot seat method) or computer-controlled. Players take on the management of one of four corporations: "Interoil", "All American", "Transoil" or "Explora Inc."

There are four different game objectives to choose from: to play a three-year game, to survive the longest of all the game companies, to receive an 80% market share or to reach 60 million dollars. There are some game mechanic variations between the missions. For example, when playing to the first 60 million dollars, drilling a borehole takes longer than in the other missions.

There are eight oil-producing regions to choose from where players must acquire licenses, tankers and oil fields: Alaska, North America, Central America, South America, Europe, USSR, the Gulf region and Indochina.

The player can request an expert opinion of an oil field's probable yield before purchase. Once a field has been bought, the player may drill manually or pay game money for automatic drilling. Enemies in the game can disrupt play using sabotage. This can be done by igniting the oil fields, destroying tankers, manipulating balance sheets, etc. To protect against such moves, a player can hire a security company.

In the course of the game there are three action sequences. Oil sales can lead to delays, and the player must manually lay pipeline. Manual drilling requires the player to correct the deviation of the drill head. Finally, burning oil wells must be deleted using dynamite. The latter can be carried out by a specialist called "Ted Redhair" (inspired by the famous Red Adair).

Reception
Kevin Warne reviewed Oil Imperium for Games International magazine, and gave it 2 stars out of 5, and stated that "It has the potential to be a good game, but after five fruitless attempts to get anything going at all they've used up all my goodwill and patience. At the very best this is strictly for those who really like these kind of games and are prepared for the hard work involved."

Reviews
Games Preview (Aug, 1989)
Amiga User International (Oct, 1989)
Commodore User (Nov, 1989)
Joystick (German) (Aug, 1989)
Commodore User (Sep, 1989)
Zero (Nov, 1989)
ACE (Advanced Computer Entertainment) (Oct, 1989)
Amiga Computing (Nov, 1989)
Atari ST User (Dec, 1989)
Your Amiga (Oct, 1989)
ASM (Aktueller Software Markt) (Oct, 1989)
ASM (Aktueller Software Markt) (May, 1989)
Joker Verlag präsentiert: Sonderheft (1993)
Joker Verlag präsentiert: Sonderheft (1994)
Power Play (1989)
Power Play (Jul, 1989)
Amiga Format (Oct, 1989)
Amiga Action (Oct, 1989)
Power Play (Dec, 1991)

References

External links
Black Gold at Lemon Amiga
Black Gold at Atari Mania

1989 video games
Amiga games
Atari ST games
Business simulation games
Commodore 64 games
DOS games
Multiplayer and single-player video games
Video games developed in Germany
Rainbow Arts games